The PGA Assistants' Championship is a golf tournament for golf club assistant professionals. It is held by the British PGA. The first championship was held in 1930 but earlier national tournaments for assistant professionals had been held since 1910.

History
The Championship traces its origin back to the PGA's first major assistants' tournament at Bushey Hall Golf Club in October 1910. The prizes for this tournament were "presented by the proprietors of Perrier Water", the winner receiving 20 guineas (£21) and a gold watch. The event was organised like the News of the World Match Play with regional qualifying over 36 holes and a knock-out stage for the 16 qualifiers. Willie Ritchie, assistant to James Braid at Walton Heath Golf Club won the Southern section qualifying by a clear 7 strokes. Willie Watt was the Scottish qualifier, although there were only four entries, assistants not being common in Scotland at the time. Ritchie and Watt, both from Scotland, met in the final. Watt was 1 up after five holes but lost the next four holes. Ritchie also won the 11th and 13th and eventually won 5&4. Ritchie had played well all year, finishing in a tie for 16th place in the 1910 Open Championship.

Regional qualifying was retained for 1911 but the final stages were decided by 36 holes of stroke play. The Perrier Water tournament continued until World War I. The final stage of the 1914 tournament was cancelled although some of the qualifying competitions had been played. The Perrier Water tournament restarted in 1920 and was won by Percy Alliss, an assistant at Royal Porthcawl Golf Club.

There was no tournament in 1921 but a new event started in 1922. Findlater, Mackie, Todd & Company, wine and spirit merchants, presented a trophy, the Findlater Shield, and prizes of £100 for the tournament. The tournament "which virtually represents the championship of the assistants" was won by Michael Daragon. Alf Perry won the shield in 1924 and 1925. The Findlater Shield continued until 1928.

In 1930 the PGA started the Assistants' Championship. The event was a 36-hole stroke-play event on a single day. The first championship was won by Bill Branch from Henbury Golf Club near Bristol. The 1933 event, planned for July at Hallamshire Golf Club, was cancelled because of a shortage of entries but was replaced by an important new £750 tournament sponsored by the Daily Mirror.

The 1933 Daily Mirror tournament was played from 25 to 28 September at Moor Park Golf Club. The first day consisted of a 36-hole qualifying stage on the High and West courses with the leading 64 playing knock-out match-play on the next three days. Sam King beat Herbert Hardman 3&2 in the final and "gained the unofficial title of 'Champion Assistant'".

The 1934 tournament was played at Wentworth Golf Club and was extended to six days, 28 May to 2 June. The prize money was £800. The 36-hole qualifying stage was over two days on the East and West courses. The match-play stage was played on the East course. The 36-hole final was won by Robert Porter, who beat Dai Rees 3&2 in the final.

In 1935, sectional qualifying was re-introduced. 64 players qualified and the event became a 72-hole stroke-play tournament. The tournament was over 3 days, 30 July to 1 August, with 18 holes on the first two-day and the leading 32 playing 36 holes on the final day. Dai Rees won the tournament with a score of 284 a shot ahead of Bill Cox. Rees won again in 1936, by three strokes from Herbert Osborne.

As winners of major tournaments, Sam King and Dai Rees were excluded from the 1937 tournament, despite still being assistants. After 72 holes Albert Chevalier and Eddie Whitcombe were tied on 289. In the 36-hole playoff the following day Chevalier beat Whitcombe by a shot, scoring 145. Whitcombe had a yard putt at the last to tie but missed.

Bill Laidlaw won the 1938 tournament by 9 strokes from Geoff White and Alan Waters. White, runner-up in 1938, won the 1939 event by 7 strokes from RJ Taylor.

For financial reasons the championship was not played again until 1949. Harry Weetman won the championship by 5 strokes from Peter Alliss and Harry Gould. Weetman won again in 1950, this time by 7 strokes from Dennis Smalldon. The leading 16 players in the 1950 championship qualified for the Gor-Ray match-play tournament at Hartsbourne Golf Club, with prize money of £580. Weetman lost in the quarter-final and the event was won by Brian Shelton.

Having made large losses from the previous two Championships, the P.G.A. initially cancelled the Assistants' Championship for 1951. Because of this the Coombe Hill Golf Club, who had been running a southern section assistants' tournament for a few years, decided to open up the Coombe Hill Assistants' Tournament to all assistants, while extending the event from 36 to 72 holes. This tournament and another held at Fairhaven Golf Club, acted as qualifying events for the Gor-Ray Cup at Hartsbourne which became the official Assistants' Championship, although now a match-play event. Unlike the Coombe Hill Assistants' Tournament, the Gor-Ray Cup was restricted to P.G.A. members. In 1952 and 1953 the Coombe Hill Assistants' Tournament was the only qualifying event, with the leading 16 and ties qualifying for the Gor-Ray Cup. From 1954 the Gor-Ray Cup became a 72-hole stroke-play event. In 1968 the assistants event was changed to an age-restricted event, the Gor-Ray Under-24 Championship. This new event was reduced to 54 holes in 1969 and was not contested again.

Since the championship restarted in 1981 it has been sponsored by Dorset Foods (1981–1982), Footjoy (1983–1984), Wilson Sporting Goods. (1985), Peugeot Talbot (1986–1987), Peugeot (1988–1992), Standard Life (1994), Reebok (1995–97), Maxfli (1999–2001), Powerade (2004),  Powerade in association with FootJoy (2005–2014), Galvin Green (2015–2017), Birdietime (2019) and Coca-Cola (2020–2022).

Winners

Since 2003 the championship has been decided over 54 holes. In 2001, 1990, 1969 and 1964 it was also decided over 54 holes.
In 1924 Perry (77) beat Tom King, Jr. (81) in an 18-hole playoff. In 1926 Thomas (73) beat Don Curtis (82) in an 18-hole playoff. In 1932 James (73) beat Sam King (74) in an 18-hole playoff. In 1937 Chevalier (145) beat Eddie Whitcombe (146) in a 36-hole playoff. In 2014 Davies beat Charles Wilson at the first hole of a sudden-death playoff. In 2019 Bullen beat Billy Hemstock at the second hole of a sudden-death playoff.

References

External links
Official site

Golf tournaments in England